Louis Gibson Head (born April 23, 1990) is an American professional baseball pitcher in the Philadelphia Phillies organization. He was drafted in the 18th round of the 2012 Major League Baseball draft by the Cleveland Indians. Head played college baseball for the Texas Tech Red Raiders and the Texas State Bobcats. He has played in Major League Baseball (MLB) for the Tampa Bay Rays, Miami Marlins, and Baltimore Orioles.

Amateur career
Head was born in Houston and grew up in Katy, Texas and attended Cinco Ranch High School. Head played college baseball at Texas Tech University for two seasons before transferring to Texas State University. As a junior, he went 2–2 with 4.20 ERA and three saves in 18 appearances.

Professional career

Cleveland Indians
Head was selected in the 18th round of the 2012 Major League Baseball draft by the Cleveland Indians. He began his professional career with the Low-A Mahoning Valley Scrappers. He split the 2013 season with the Single-A Lake County Captains and the High-A Carolina Mudcats, also appearing in one game for the Triple-A Columbus Clippers, registering a cumulative 4–4 record and 2.48 ERA with 66 strikeouts. He split the next season between Carolina and the Double-A Akron RubberDucks. In 2015 and 2016, Head played in Akron, pitching to a 4.03 ERA with 59 strikeouts in 2015 and a 2.66 ERA with 61 strikeouts in 2016. He spent the 2017 season in Columbus, recording a 3–2 record and 3.23 ERA in  innings pitched. Head was invited to Spring Training with the Indians in 2018, but did not make the club and was assigned to Columbus to begin the season. On August 2, 2018, Head was released by the Indians after pitching to a 12.64 ERA in  innings for Columbus.

Los Angeles Dodgers
On February 23, 2019, Head signed a minor league deal with the Los Angeles Dodgers organization. He was assigned to the Double-A Tulsa Drillers to begin the season. He split the 2019 season between four minor league affiliates, including the Triple-A Oklahoma City Dodgers, registering a 6.34 ERA with 40 strikeouts in  innings of work. On November 4, 2019, Head elected free agency.

Seattle Mariners
On February 27, 2020, Head signed a minor league contract with the Seattle Mariners organization. He was assigned to the Triple-A Tacoma Rainiers to begin the season but was released on May 27, 2020. He did not play in a game in 2020 due to the cancellation of the Minor League Baseball season because of the COVID-19 pandemic, and sold solar panels door-to-door in Arizona in his time away from affiliated ball.

Tampa Bay Rays
On February 12, 2021, Head signed a minor league contract with the Tampa Bay Rays organization and was invited to spring training as a non-roster invitee. In seven spring appearances, Head pitched to a 1.50 ERA and 0.67 WHIP in six innings of work, but did not make the club out of spring training. Head was selected to the Rays major league roster on April 23, 2021, which was also his 31st birthday. On April 25, Head made his MLB debut against the Toronto Blue Jays, pitching a scoreless inning of relief.

Miami Marlins
On November 14, 2021, the Rays traded Head to the Miami Marlins for Josh Roberson. To make room on the 40-man roster, outfielder Brian Miller was designated for assignment.

Baltimore Orioles
Head was claimed off waivers by the Baltimore Orioles on July 12, 2022. He made five relief appearances with the Orioles and allowed one run and six hits in five innings before being designated for assignment on October 14, 2022. He elected free agency on November 10, 2022.

Philadelphia Phillies 
On January 11, 2023, Head signed a minor league contract with the Philadelphia Phillies organization.

Personal life
Head and his wife, Jenny, married in March 2021.

References

External links

Texas State Bobcats bio
Texas Tech Red Raiders bio

1990 births
Living people
Akron RubberDucks players
American expatriate baseball players in the Dominican Republic
Arizona League Dodgers players
Baltimore Orioles players
Baseball players from Houston
Carolina Mudcats players
Columbus Clippers players
Durham Bulls players
Eau Claire Express players
Gigantes del Cibao players
Lake County Captains players
Mahoning Valley Scrappers players
Major League Baseball pitchers
Miami Marlins players
Norfolk Tides players
Oklahoma City Dodgers players
Peoria Javelinas players
Tampa Bay Rays players
Texas State Bobcats baseball players
Texas Tech Red Raiders baseball players
Tulsa Drillers players